1874 Northwich Football Club is a football club based in Northwich, Cheshire, England. Home matches are played at Barnton's Townfield ground.

The club is fully owned by its supporters, and is run by a democratically elected board.

History
The club was established on 15 November 2012 at a meeting at Lostock Social Club in Lostock Gralam, near Northwich, when members of the Northwich Victoria Supporters' Trust were given the opportunity to decide on creating a new football club due to growing disenfranchisement with how Northwich Victoria has been run over many years. The vote ended with a 141–4 vote in favour of a new club. It had emerged on the day of the vote that the owner of Northwich Victoria had been declared bankrupt (later annulled) and therefore failed the FA Fit and Proper Persons test.

On 29 November 2012 fans attended an open meeting in Northwich, where they chose the name 1874 Northwich for the club. In order to avoid legal issues over the new club's name, none of the proposed options included the words Vics or Victoria. The date 1874 was chosen because it was the year in which the original club named Northwich Victoria was founded, or at least, when they played their first formal match. The original club became defunct and disbanded in 1890, when a new club, which elected to use the name Northwich Victoria was founded from an amalgamation of the original club bearing the same name and Hartford and Davenham United.  Alongside the naming of the club, fans were also given the chance to vote on a motto; the phrase 'Ever Glorious', which was used by the Cheshire Regiment was chosen due to their links with the town of Northwich. One of the other options included the Latin translation, 'Semper Gloriosa'. Ever Glorious has also become established as the name of the club's match-day programme.

On 3 January 2013 it was confirmed that the club had been officially registered with the Cheshire County Football Association and had applied to join the North West Counties League in time for the 2013–14 season, and were accepted into Division One of the league on 23 May. The appointment of the club's first manager, former Winsford United and Ashton Athletic boss Ian Street was announced on 25 April 2013, with his assistant Lee Duckworth being announced three days later. The club played their first match on 10 July 2013 against local team Lostock Gralam, winning 3–1.  Their first honours came three days later in the Supporters Direct Shield, when they defeated AFC Rushden & Diamonds 3–0 in Widnes at the Halton Stadium.

Their first league game was played on 3 August 2013 against Oldham Boro, where 490 fans attended the game which finished 1–1. In their first season, the club finished third in Division One, initially missing out on promotion to the Premier Division on goal difference. However, following the resignation of Formby in May, Northwich were promoted in their place. In their second season, the club finished third in the Premier Division and  entered the FA Cup for the first time. They finished fourth in the Premier Division in 2015–16, and also won the Mid-Cheshire Senior Cup, beating Witton Albion in the final.

Ian Street resigned as first-team manager on 12 March 2017, with assistant Paul Bowyer and first-team coach Wayne Goodison becoming caretaker joint managers before being appointed on a permanent basis. The club went on to win the Mid-Cheshire Senior Cup with a 1–0 win over Northwich Victoria in the final. In 2017–18 they reached the semi-finals of the FA Vase, losing 4–2 on aggregate to Thatcham Town. The following season saw the club win the North West Counties Football League Cup, beating league champions City of Liverpool 1–0 in the final at Moss Lane.  In July 2021 the club won the much-delayed 2019–20 League Cup, defeating Runcorn Town 6–3 in the final. After the 2020–21 season was curtailed due to the COVID-19 pandemic, the club were promoted to Division One West of the Northern Premier League having had the highest points-per-game (PPG) average in the North West Counties League Premier Division over the previous two curtailed seasons.

Season-by-season

Ground
The club play at the Townfield ground in Barnton, groundsharing with Barnton F.C. They previously played at Winsford United's Barton Stadium from their establishment until the end of the 2018–19 season.

Managerial records
Based on win % in all matches excluding friendlies, correct as of 28 June 2022

Honours
North West Counties League
Challenge Cup winners 2018-19, 2019–21
Mid-Cheshire Senior Cup
Winners 2015–16, 2016–17
Supporters Direct Shield
Winners 2013–14

Records
Best FA Cup performance: Third qualifying round, 2017–18
Best FA Vase performance: Semi-finals, 2017–18
Record attendance: 1,693 vs Thatcham Town, FA Vase semi-final, 24 March 2018
Record home win: 9–0 vs Wigan Robin Park, 5 October 2014, FA Vase second qualifying round
Record away win: 0–9 vs Litherland REMYCA, 2 November 2019, North West Counties League Premier Division
Record home defeat: 3–6 vs City of Liverpool, 4 August 2018, North West Counties League Premier Division
Record away defeat: 4–0 vs Ashton Athletic, 6 October 2015, North West Counties League Premier Division

See also

1874 Northwich F.C. players
1874 Northwich F.C. managers

References

External links 
Official website

 
2012 establishments in England
Association football clubs established in 2012
Fan-owned football clubs in England
Football clubs in Cheshire
Football clubs in England
Northwich
Northwich Victoria F.C.
North West Counties Football League clubs
Northern Premier League clubs